K. A. Vezhavendan (5 May 1936 - 26 January 2022) was an Indian politician and former Member of the Legislative Assembly of Tamil Nadu. He was elected to the Tamil Nadu legislative assembly from Gummidipundi constituency as a Dravida Munnetra Kazhagam candidate in 1967, and 1971 elections. He died on 26 January 2022.

Electoral performance

References 

1936 births
2022 deaths
Members of the Tamil Nadu Legislative Assembly
Dravida Munnetra Kazhagam politicians
People from Tiruvallur district